The Soul of Nina Simone is a DualDisc, which contains a CD on one side of the disc and a DVD on the other containing footage from her appearance at 1969's Harlem Cultural Festival.

Track listing
"Feeling Good" 
"In the Dark" 
"Since I Fell For You" 
"Don't Let Me Be Misunderstood" 
"To Love Somebody" 
"My Man's Gone Now" 
"I Think It's Going to Rain Today" 
"My Baby Just Cares For Me" 
"I Want a Little Sugar in My Bowl" 
"Save Me" 
"The Look of Love"
"I Get Along Without You Very Well" 
"Just Like Tom Thumb's Blues" 
"Nobody's Fault But Mine" 
"Porgy and Bess Medley"

Personnel
Nina Simone – vocals, piano
Arthur Adams – guitar, bass
Everett Barksdale – guitar
Rudy Stevenson – guitar
Buddy Lucas – harmonica
Ernie Hayes – organ
Chuck Rainey – bass
Bob Bushnell – bass
Bernard Purdie – drums
 Cornell McFadden – drums

Charts

References

2005 compilation albums
Nina Simone compilation albums
RCA Records compilation albums